Kim Eun-hui (born 3 May 1973) is a South Korean diver. She competed in two events at the 1988 Summer Olympics.

References

External links
 

1973 births
Living people
South Korean female divers
Olympic divers of South Korea
Divers at the 1988 Summer Olympics
Divers at the 1990 Asian Games
Place of birth missing (living people)
20th-century South Korean women